, often known mononymously as Kyogo, is a Japanese professional footballer who plays as a forward for Scottish Premiership club Celtic and the Japan national team.

Club career

FC Gifu
Kyogo Furuhashi joined J2 League club FC Gifu in 2017.

Vissel Kobe
On 1 August 2018, it was confirmed that Furuhashi would join the J1 League club Vissel Kobe for the rest of the 2018 season 

In the club's Emperor's Cup semi-final match against Shimizu S-Pulse on 21 December 2019, Furuhashi scored Vissel's third goal to seal a 3–1 victory and a spot in their first ever major cup final. Vissel would go on to defeat Kashima Antlers in the final on 1 January 2020.

Furuhashi scored Vissel Kobe's second goal in their 2020 Japanese Super Cup victory over Yokohama F. Marinos on 8 February 2020. Four days later in Vissel Kobe's first ever match in a continental competition against Malaysia Super League champions JDT, Furuhashi scored again in a 5–1 victory. Furuhashi netted the lone goal in the second group stage match against Suwon Samsung Bluewings on 19 February.

Celtic
On 16 July 2021, Furuhashi joined Scottish Premiership side Celtic for £4.5 million, signing a four-year deal. He scored his first goal for the club on his debut against Jablonec in the UEFA Europa League third qualifying round on 5 August 2021. Three days later, Furuhashi scored his first Scottish Premiership goals, netting a 67-minute hat-trick in a 6–0 win against Dundee. He followed up his excellent run of form by scoring against Hearts, and again in the UEFA Europa League against AZ Alkmaar.

In the lead up to a game against Rangers on 29 August 2021, a video featuring Rangers supporters racially abusing Kyogo over his ethnicity was posted on social media. This led to an outpouring of support for the striker. 

Furuhashi picked up an injury while on international duty with Japan in September, but returned after five games, scoring on 3 October in a 2–1 victory against Aberdeen and netting the only goal of the game in a home league win against Hearts on 2 December. On 19 December 2021, Furuhashi scored twice against Hibernian in the final of the Scottish League Cup. The game ended 2–1, winning Furuhashi his first trophy with Celtic. 

On 28 August 2022, Furuhashi scored a hat-trick in a 9–0 away win against Dundee United. A month later, Furuhashi made his UEFA Champions League debut in a 3–0 home defeat against Real Madrid.

On 2 January 2023, Furuhashi scored late against Rangers to salvage a 2–2 away draw.

On 26 February 2023, Furuhashi scored a second consecutive League Cup finals double, now against Rangers in the 2023 Scottish League Cup Final.

International career
Furuhashi earned his first Japan cap in against Venezuela on 19 November 2019 in the 2019 edition of the Kirin Cup. The result was a 1–4 home loss at the Panasonic Stadium Suita.

Despite his form at Celtic, Furuhashi was not included in the Japan squad for the 2022 FIFA World Cup in Qatar. This came as a surprise to many supporters and media outlets at the time, where Japan manager Hajime Moriyasu justified his decision by saying: "We selected players who will be on the same wavelength as a team, who will be able to move and link up together, who through their organisation will be able to make use of their individual strengths".

Career statistics

Club

International

Scores and results list Japan's goal tally first, score column indicates score after each Furuhashi goal.

Honours
Vissel Kobe
Emperor's Cup: 2019
Japanese Super Cup: 2020

Celtic
Scottish Premiership: 2021–22
Scottish League Cup: 2021–22, 2022–23

Individual
PFA Scotland Team of the Year (Premiership): 2021–22
Japan Pro-Footballers Association awards: Best XI (2022)

References

External links

Profile at FC Gifu (archived 25 June 2018)

1995 births
Living people
Chuo University alumni
Association football people from Nara Prefecture
Japanese footballers
Association football wingers
Association football forwards
Japan international footballers
J1 League players
J2 League players
Scottish Professional Football League players
FC Gifu players
Vissel Kobe players
Celtic F.C. players
Japanese expatriate footballers
Japanese expatriate sportspeople in Scotland
Expatriate footballers in Scotland